Li Tai-hsiang (20 February 1941 – 2 January 2014) was a Taiwanese Amis composer and folk songwriter. He was best known for penning a series of popular Mandarin-language pop and folk songs throughout the 1960s and 1970s at the height of the genres' popularity. He also composed many classical works.

References

1941 births
2014 deaths
Taiwanese songwriters
Taiwanese composers
Taiwanese classical composers
Amis people
People from Taitung County
National Taiwan University of Arts alumni